Kroghville is an unincorporated community located in the town of Lake Mills, Jefferson County, Wisconsin, United States. The community is named for Casper Krogh, a Norwegian emigrant who opened a sawmill in the area in the 1840s.

References

Unincorporated communities in Jefferson County, Wisconsin
Unincorporated communities in Wisconsin